Major general Fei Junlong (born 5 May 1965) is a Chinese military pilot and an taikonaut. He was the commander of Shenzhou 6, the second crewed spaceflight of China's space program, and was selected as commander for the Shenzhou 15 mission to the Tiangong space station.

Early life 
He was born in Suzhou, Jiangsu province of China and was recruited from high school by the People's Liberation Army Air Force (PLAAF) in 1982 at the age of 17.  He graduated with excellent marks from the PLAAF's No. 9 Aviation School, the Changchun No.1 Flight College of the PLA Air Force and Flight Training School of the Air Force. In the PLAAF, he was a pilot, flight trainer and flight technology inspector.

Career 
Fei was selected for the CNSA astronaut program in 1998. He was in the final five selected for China's first manned space flight, Shenzhou 5. He was the commander on the Shenzhou 6 flight that launched October 12, 2005, with Nie Haisheng serving as flight engineer. They landed on October 17, 2005.

Personal life 
He was married in 1991 and has one son. During his personal time he dabbles in fine arts.

Awards and honors 
 Command Pilot of PLAAF, 1982
 Merit Citation Class II, 1996
 Chinese May 4 Medal for Youth Having Outstanding Contributions, 2005
 Aerospace Achievement Medal, 2005
 The honorary title of "Space Hero", 2005
 Top 10 Inspirational Models of China, 2006
 Asteroid 9512 Feijunlong, 2007
 Honorary Professor of Nanjing Audit University, 2011
 Honorary Member of Chinese Society of Astronautics, 2012

The asteroid 9512 Feijunlong was named after him.

See also 
 List of Chinese astronauts

External links 

 Fèi Jùnlóng at the Encyclopedia Astronautica. Accessed 23 July 2005.
 
 Spacefacts biography of Fèi Jùnlóng

1965 births
Living people
People's Liberation Army Astronaut Corps
Shenzhou program astronauts
People from Kunshan
People's Liberation Army Air Force personnel
People's Liberation Army generals from Jiangsu
Spacewalkers